Parker Ehinger (born December 30, 1992) is an American football guard who is a free agent. He played college football at the University of Cincinnati. He was drafted by the Kansas City Chiefs in the fourth round of the 2016 NFL Draft.

Early years
Ehinger attended Rockford High School, where he was a two-year starter on the offensive line, while also seeing some action at tight end. As a senior, he helped the team achieve an 11-2 record, a district championship, and an appearance in the state semifinals. He received Division 1-2 All-State and Detroit Free Press Dream Team honors. He was named First-team All-OK-RED and All-Area in his last 2 seasons.

He also practiced the discus throw and shot put.

College career
Ehinger accepted a football scholarship from the University of Cincinnati. He started 13 games at right tackle as a redshirt freshman. He started at right guard as a sophomore and junior.

He started at left tackle as a senior, helping the offense rank No. 6 nationally in total offense with a 537.8-yard average per game.

Professional career

Kansas City Chiefs
Ehinger was selected by the Kansas City Chiefs in the fourth round (105th overall) of the 2016 NFL Draft. As a rookie, he started 4 games at left guard. On November 5, He was placed on the injured reserve list, after tearing the ACL, MCL and meniscus in his right knee during the week 8 game against the Indianapolis Colts.

On August 21, 2017, he was activated from the Physical Unable to Perform list. He started in the season opener at right guard, but was declared inactive the rest of the season.

Dallas Cowboys
On August 30, 2018, Ehinger was traded to the Dallas Cowboys in exchange for cornerback Charvarius Ward. He suffered a knee injury in practice and was placed on the injured reserve list on September 7, 2018.

On April 10, 2019, the Cowboys waived Ehinger.

Jacksonville Jaguars
On April 11, 2019, Ehinger was claimed off waivers by the Jacksonville Jaguars. He was waived on May 9, 2019.

Arizona Cardinals
On August 2, 2019, Ehinger was signed by the Arizona Cardinals. He was released on August 31, 2019.

Baltimore Ravens
On September 16, 2019, Ehinger was signed to the Baltimore Ravens practice squad. He was promoted to the active roster on November 30, 2019. He was placed on injured reserve on January 8, 2020.

Ehinger re-signed with the Ravens on July 29, 2020. He was released on September 5, 2020. He was re-signed to their practice squad on December 4, 2020. He was placed on the practice squad/injured list on January 12, 2021. His practice squad contract with the team expired after the season on January 25, 2021.

Las Vegas Raiders
On June 4, 2021, Ehinger signed with the Las Vegas Raiders. He was released on August 23, 2021.

Detroit Lions
On October 6, 2021, Ehinger was signed to the Detroit Lions practice squad.

References

External links
 Cincinnati Bearcats bio

1992 births
Living people
People from Rockford, Michigan
Players of American football from Michigan
American football offensive guards
Cincinnati Bearcats football players
Kansas City Chiefs players
Dallas Cowboys players
Jacksonville Jaguars players
Arizona Cardinals players
Baltimore Ravens players
Las Vegas Raiders players
Detroit Lions players